The knockout stage of the 2008 CAF Champions League was played from 5 October to 16 November 2008.

Bracket

Semi finals 
The first legs were played on 5 October and the second legs on 17–19 October.

                       

|}

Final 

                    
|}

References

External links
2008 CAF Champions League - todor66.com

Knockout stage